Milan Lalkovič (born 9 December 1992) is a Slovak professional footballer who plays as a winger for Greek Super League 2 club Makedonikos.

Club career

Early career
Born in Košice, Lalkovič spent his early career with Košice-Barca and MFK Košice before signing for English club Chelsea in 2007. He joined Doncaster Rovers in August 2010; Lalkovič made a total of six appearances for Doncaster before returning to Chelsea.

Lalkovič signed a season-long loan deal with Dutch club ADO Den Haag in August 2011, and a season-long loan deal with Portuguese club Vitória de Guimarães in July 2012. On 4 January 2013 Lalkovič was recalled by Chelsea as he was struggling to find regular playing time.

On 15 July 2013, Lalkovič signed for Walsall on a six-month loan deal. During this period, Lalkovič scored 4 times in 24 appearances. On 6 January 2014, Lalkovič extended his loan with Walsall until the end of the season. On 23 May 2014, Chelsea released Lalkovič and made him available for free transfer.

On 25 July 2014, Lalkovič signed a deal with Czech FK Mladá Boleslav. Following the termination of his deal with the side, he completed a free transfer to League One side Barnsley on 8 January 2015, signing an eighteen-month contract. Lalkovič made his Barnsley début coming off the bench in a 2–0 victory against Yeovil Town. Lalkovič made seventeen appearances in total for the Tykes but was permitted to conclude his contract early at the end of the season.

Walsall
Lalkovič rejoined Walsall on 16 July 2015, signing a one–year deal with the Saddlers. He scored his first goal in his second spell at Walsall in a League Cup tie against Brighton & Hove Albion.

Portsmouth
On 28 June 2016, Lalkovič signed a two-year deal with Portsmouth for an undisclosed fee after failing to agree a new contract with Walsall. He scored his first goal for the club in a 5–1 win over Barnet on 24 September 2016.

On 20 January 2017, Lalkovič joined Scottish Premiership side Ross County on loan for the remainder of the 2016–17 campaign.

On transfer deadline day, Milan had his contract cancelled 6 months early by mutual consent.

Czech First League
On 18 October 2018, Lalkovič joined Czech First Division Side Sigma Olomouc on a short-term deal until the end of the season. After the season, he left Sigma Olomouc for FC Baník Ostrava.

Career statistics

Honours
Vitória de Guimarães
Taça de Portugal: 2012–13

References

External links
 
 
 

1992 births
Living people
Association football forwards
Slovak footballers
Expatriate footballers in England
Expatriate footballers in the Netherlands
Expatriate footballers in Portugal
Slovak expatriate footballers
Slovak expatriate sportspeople in England
Slovak expatriate sportspeople in the Netherlands
Slovak expatriate sportspeople in Portugal
Chelsea F.C. players
Doncaster Rovers F.C. players
ADO Den Haag players
Vitória S.C. players
Walsall F.C. players
Portsmouth F.C. players
Ross County F.C. players
English Football League players
Eredivisie players
Primeira Liga players
Scottish Professional Football League players
Slovak expatriate sportspeople in Scotland
Expatriate footballers in Scotland
SK Sigma Olomouc players
FC Baník Ostrava players
Sportspeople from Košice
FK Mladá Boleslav players
Boston United F.C. players
National League (English football) players
Makedonikos F.C. players
Expatriate footballers in Greece
Slovak expatriate sportspeople in Greece